Shields, also called Escutcheons, are one of the four suits of playing cards within the Swiss deck along with Acorns, Bells and Roses. This suit was invented in 15th century German speaking lands and is a survivor from a large pool of experimental suit signs created to replace the Latin suits. One example from the mid-15th century is a five-suited deck with the Latin suits plus a suit of shields.

Characteristics 
As its name suggests, the shield symbol is a stylized depiction of a warrior's shield in yellow. The coat of arms varies from deck to deck.

In the German language, the shield is called Schilten.

Cards 
The following images depict the suit of Shields from an 1850 Swiss-suited pack:

See also 
 Card suit

References

Card suits